Sisurcana itatiaiae is a species of moth of the family Tortricidae. It is found in Rio de Janeiro, Brazil.

The wingspan is about 22 mm. The ground colour of the forewings is creamish with pale ferruginous suffusion in the dorsal and part of the terminal areas of the wing. The hindwings are whitish cream with numerous pale brownish grey strigulae (fine streaks) and a darker row of spots.

Etymology
The species name refers to the type locality, Itatiaia, Brazil.

References

Moths described in 2011
Sisurcana
Moths of South America
Taxa named by Józef Razowski